"Hide/Pieces" is the fifth single by the American Christian rock band Red from their debut full-length studio album End of Silence. The song was written by Anthony Armstrong, Rob Graves, Jasen Rauch and Bernie Herms. The song was released on November 12, 2007, although it was sent to all the fans who submitted their faces as part of the hype for the new album on June 6, 2006.

Track listing

Charts

2006 songs
2007 singles
Red (American band) songs
Essential Records (Christian) singles
Songs written by Rob Graves
Songs written by Jasen Rauch
Songs written by Bernie Herms